Holiday for Skins is a 1959 album by jazz drummer Art Blakey. Recorded for the Blue Note label in November 1958, the album was released in two volumes before being reissued together in a  CD set in 2006.

Track listing
All compositions by Art Blakey except as indicated

Holiday for Skins Volume 1 (BLP 4004)
 "Aghano" - 6:07
 "The Feast" - 8:56
 "Mirage" - 10:30
 "Lamento Africano" - 8:25

Holiday for Skins Volume 2 (BLP 4005)
 "O'Tinde" - 6:17
 "Swingin' Kilts" (Ray Bryant) - 8:53
 "Dinga" - 9:00
 "Reflection" (Bryant) - 9:06

CD reissue
 "The Feast" - 8:56
 "Aghano" - 6:07
 "Lamento Africano" - 8:25
 "Mirage" - 10:30
 "O'Tinde" - 6:17
 "Swingin' Kilts" - 8:53
 "Dinga" - 9:00
 "Reflection" - 9:06

Personnel
Art Blakey - drums, chanting
Donald Byrd - trumpet (tracks 1, 4, 6 & 8)
Ray Bryant - piano
Wendell Marshall - bass
Art Taylor - drums
Philly Joe Jones - drums, chanting, vocals
Ray Barretto, Victor Gonzales, Julio Martinez, Sabu Martinez, Chonguito Vincente - bongos, congas
Fred Pagani - timbales
Andy Delannoy - maracas
Austin Cromer, Hal Rasheed - chanting

References

Art Blakey albums
1959 albums
Albums produced by Alfred Lion
Blue Note Records albums